Leioheterodon madagascariensis, the Malagasy Giant Hognose, is a harmless species of snake that can be found in Madagascar, Nosy Be, Nosy Sakatia and Comoros Islands. They can grow from 130 to 180 cm. It is thought by some to have been introduced to the Grande Comoro.

References

Pseudoxyrhophiidae
Reptiles described in 1854